Georgina Hermitage,  (born 28 March 1989) is a former British parasport athlete competing in T37 sprint events. In 2015, she qualified for the 2015 IPC Athletics World Championships in Doha, selected for the T37 100m and 200m. She took the gold in the 400m sprint, setting a new world record.

Personal history
Hermitage was born in Guildford, England in 1989. She has cerebral palsy which mainly affects the left side of her body. She was educated at George Abbot School in her home town. In 2012 Hermitage gave birth to her first child.

Sporting career
Hermitage took up athletics as a school girl and joined Guildford & Godalming Athletics Club. At the age of 14, frustrated by her lack of progress compared to her peers, she was approached by coach Hazel Childs who suggested she switch to parasports. Hermitage took the advice badly and quit athletics in protest, though she later admitted regretting this decision.

In 2012, following the London Paralympics and inspired to leave a legacy to her newborn daughter, Hermitage decided to become classified as a parasport athlete. She was classified as a T37 competitor and in 2013 she entered her first meets as a disability runner. She intended to compete throughout 2014, but a stress fracture to her foot saw her miss the majority of that year's competition including the 2014 IPC Athletics European Championships in Swansea.

In February 2015 Hermitage made her international debut when she travelled to Dubai to take part in the Fazaa International, the first IPC Grand Prix of the year. At the meet she ran 14.22 to set a new personal best in the 100m sprint, winning gold in the process. In June that year Hermitage represented Great Britain again when she competed at the Berlin IPC Grand Prix. There she entered the 100m, 200m and 400m sprints. She won all three events, posting personal bests in the 100m (13.80s) and 200m (28.48s) and beating Lisa McIntosh's 15-year-old record in the T37 400m sprint with a time of 1:02.70. Just over a month later Hermitage entered her third Grand Prix of the year, held at the Olympic Park in London. There she improved on her record in the 400m winning the race in 1:02.48.

At the end of 2015 Hermitage represented Great Britain at the IPC Athletics World Championships in Doha. There she entered the T37 100m and 400m sprints. In the heats for the 100m she recorded a personal best of 13.79, finishing second to team mate Kadeena Cox who set a new world record. In the finals the result was the same, Hermitage came second to Cox to win silver, her first major international medal. Three days later Hermitage competed in her favoured 400m event. Her time of 1:02.01 was an improvement of her own world record, beating the World Champion, France's Mandy Francois-Elie, into second place.

At the 2016 Rio Paralympics, Hermitage won the T37 100m final in a time of 13.13 to take the gold medal. She also won gold in the T37 400m and silver in the T35-38 4 x 100m relay.

She was appointed Member of the Order of the British Empire (MBE) in the 2017 New Year Honours for services to athletics.

Hermitage retired in early 2020.

References

External links 
 

1989 births
English female sprinters
Living people
World record holders in Paralympic athletics
British disabled sportspeople
Sportswomen with disabilities
Track and field athletes with disabilities
Athletes (track and field) at the 2016 Summer Paralympics
People from Guildford
People with cerebral palsy
Medalists at the 2016 Summer Paralympics
Paralympic gold medalists for Great Britain
Paralympic silver medalists for Great Britain
Members of the Order of the British Empire
Paralympic medalists in athletics (track and field)
Paralympic athletes of Great Britain